Joel Larway (born May 14, 1968, in Columbus, Ohio, United States) is an American curler from Mukilteo, Washington.

Awards
USA Curling Male Athlete of the Year: 2004.

Teams

Personal life
His brother Jason is a curler too. The two brothers curled together for many years.

References

External links
 
 

Living people
1968 births
Sportspeople from Columbus, Ohio
American male curlers
American curling champions
Continental Cup of Curling participants
People from Mukilteo, Washington
Sportspeople from the Seattle metropolitan area
20th-century American people
21st-century American people